The 1912 United States presidential election in Montana took place on November 5, 1912 as part of the 1912 United States presidential election. Voters chose four representatives, or electors to the Electoral College, who voted for president and vice president.

In this four-way contest election, Montana voted for the Democratic nominee New Jersey Governor Woodrow Wilson over the Progressive nominee former President Theodore "Teddy" Roosevelt, Republican nominee President William Howard Taft, and Socialist Party of America nominee union leader Eugene V. Debs. Wilson won the state by a margin of 6.87%.

Results

Results by county

See also
 United States presidential elections in Montana

Notes

References

Montana
1912
1912 Montana elections